Zambesomima is a genus of flies in the family Tachinidae.

Species
 Zambesomima hirsuta Mesnil, 1967

References

Tachinidae genera